Charles Frederick Edwards (9 October 1891 – 3 October 1972), variously known as "Fred Edwards" and as "Charlie Edwards", was an Australian rules footballer who played with Essendon and Melbourne in the Victorian Football League (VFL).

Family
The son of Charles James Edwards (1866-1938), and Sarah Annie Edwards (1868-1907), née Smith, Charles Frederick Edwards was born at Richmond, Victoria on 9 October 1891.

He married Violet Daphne Hailes (1891-1963) on 7 November 1914.

Football

Essendon (VFL)
Recruited by Essendon from the Beverley Football Club in the Metropolitan Amateur Football Association (MJFA), he played one senior game for Essendon: against Richmond on 3 May 1913.

The three "new" Essendon footballers who had played on 3 May 1913 — that is, Edwards, Hughie Tait, and Jim Moore — were not selected to play against Collingwood on the following Saturday (10 May 1913).

Melbourne (VFL)
Cleared from Essendon to Melbourne on 2 July 1913.

Death
He died at Windsor, Victoria on 3 October 1972.

Notes

References

 Maplestone, M., Flying Higher: History of the Essendon Football Club 1872–1996, Essendon Football Club, (Melbourne), 1996. 
 Topics of the Week: Prominent North Richmond Business Man Retires. — Mr. W.A. Lovell, of Victoria street, Succeeded by "Footbailer" Edwards, The Richmond Guardian, (Saturday, 8 February 1919), p.2.

External links 
 
 
 Charlie Edwards, at Demonwiki.

1891 births
1972 deaths
Australian rules footballers from Victoria (Australia)
Essendon Football Club players
Melbourne Football Club players